Ming Xu is the name of:

 Mingsioi, Qing Governor general of the Ili Region
 Xu Ming (徐明, 1971–2015), billionaire entrepreneur, former owner of Dalian Shide F.C.
 Xu Ming (figure skater) (徐铭, born 1981), Chinese figure skater

See also
Xu Ming (disambiguation)